The Ukraine men's national under-21 volleyball team (Yuniorska zbirna Ukrainy z voleibolu) represents Ukraine in international men's volleyball competitions and friendly matches under the age 21.

Results

Team

Current roster
The following is the Ukrainian roster in the 2020 Men's U20 Volleyball European Championship.

See also
Ukraine men's national volleyball team
Ukraine women's national volleyball team

References

 Ukrainian Volleyball Federation (in Ukrainian)

under-21
National men's under-21 volleyball teams
Men's national sports teams of Ukraine
volleyball